Crystal Bay is a census-designated place (CDP) on the north shore of Lake Tahoe in Washoe County, Nevada, United States. The population was 305 at the 2010 census. It is part of the Reno−Sparks Metropolitan Statistical Area. Prior to 2010, it was listed by the U.S. Census Bureau within the Incline Village–Crystal Bay CDP.

Geography

The CDP is located on the north shore of Lake Tahoe, adjacent to the California state line.

Climate
Crystal Bay has a humid continental climate (Dfb) with warm to hot summers with cool nights and moderately cold winters with frigid nights.

Demographics

Education
The region is served by the Washoe County School District.

See also
 List of census-designated places in Nevada

References

External links

Census-designated places in Nevada
Census-designated places in Washoe County, Nevada
Lake Tahoe
Reno, NV Metropolitan Statistical Area